Petitcodiac is a formerly incorporated Canadian village in Westmorland County, New Brunswick.

On 1 January 2023, Petitcodiac annexed all or part of four local service districts to form the new village of Three Rivers. The community's name remains in official use.

History

It is named after the Petitcodiac River, which begins in the village at the junction of the North River and Anagance River. The name is believed to be derived either from a Mi'kmaq word meaning "bends like a bow" or from a Maliseet word meaning "sound of thunder".  Petcoucoyee (Franquelin, 1686); Pacoudiac (deCouagne, 1749); present spelling from mid 19th century.

Present day

The Community Centres around Route 890, Route 885, Route 905, Route 106 and Route 1.

The village features a regional school, an outdoor swimming pool, an arena, a bowling alley, as well as several family-owned shops and churches servicing the surrounding area. There is also a Royal Canadian Air Cadet Squadron.

The Westmorland County Agricultural Fair, established by William Balzer in 1967, is an agricultural fair with a horse show, a sheep show, a produce contest, crafts and baked goods, and a beauty pageant.

Demographics

Population trend 

Income (2016)

Mother tongue (2016)

Neighbouring communities
Intervale
River Glade
The Glades
Pollett River
Anagance
Hillgrove
Glenvale

Notable people
Michael Venart

See also
List of communities in New Brunswick

References

Village of Petitcodiac

External links

Communities in Westmorland County, New Brunswick
Former villages in New Brunswick